Bertrand Flornoy (27 March 1910 – 25 April 1980) was a French explorer and archaeologist.

Flornoy in 1936 became special advisor to the National Museum of Natural History, which sends mission studies and exploration in the Amazon Basin and the Andes.

Flornoy specialized in the Upper Amazon of Peru, and in 1941 and 1942 discovered the sources of the Marañón River,  a constituent of the Amazon.

Works
Printed books are ordered by date of first publication.
Upper Amazon, Paris, Plon, 1939, repr. Paris, Plon, 1953.
Three French among the Indians gear heads, Paris, Plon, 1939, repr. Rio de Janeiro, Atlantica Editora, 1945, repr. Paris, Plon, 1953 (reissue common with Upper Amazon).
Among the Indians of the Amazon, Paris, ed. I serve, 1943.
Discovery of sources, from the Andes to the Amazon rainforest, Paris, I serve, 1946, repr. Paris, I serve, 1951.
Sea ice in the jungle, collective work, Paris, Plon, 1952.
IAWA, free people, Paris, Amiot-Dumont, 1953, repr. 1955.
The headwaters of the Amazon, with Rouch Geneviève, Paris, F. Nathan, 1954.
Inca Adventure, Paris, Amiot-Dumont, 1955, repr. Paris, History Book Club, 1955, repr. Paris, Perrin, 1963, repr. Paris, Perrin, 1980
Archaeological exploration of the Alto Río Marañón (Río Marañón sources of the Rio Sarma), 1955.
Mission in the Upper Amazon, 1956.
At the forefront of exploration, Paris, Fayard, 1960.
Amazon, Lands and men, finding sources, Paris, ed. Perrin, 1969, repr. Évreux, Circle bibliophile, 1970.
Other: Various articles, forewords, contributions.

Documentaries
Indian highlands, Paris, 1947 .
Conquest of the jungle, Paris, Empire, 1948 .
My friend Ti, gear heads, Paris, Empire, 1948 .
IAWA! at the heart of the Amazon, 1953.

French archaeologists
1980 deaths
1910 births
20th-century archaeologists